Darryl Hill (born 30 April 1996 in Leeds, Yorkshire) is an English-born former professional Manx snooker player.

Career 
In 2014, Hill entered the EBSA European Under-21 Snooker Championships as the number one ranked entrant, but lost in the third round to Ashley Carty. The following year, Hill made it to the final, where he defeated Louis Heathcote 6–3 to win the 2015 EBSA European Under-21 Snooker Championships; as a result, he was given a two-year card on the professional World Snooker Tour for the 2015–16 and 2016–17 seasons.

Hill beat Robert Milkins 6–4 to qualify for the 2015 International Championship. On his debut at the main stage of a ranking event, he was defeated 6–2 by Jimmy Robertson. He played at the UK Championship and Welsh Open for the first time, losing 6–3 to Thepchaiya Un-Nooh in the former and 4–1 to Graeme Dott in the latter. Hill received a bye in the first round of the China Open, due to Mark Selby withdrawing, and won a second-round ranking event match for the first time by beating James Wattana 5–3, before losing by a reversal of this scoreline to Dominic Dale. At the end of the season, Hill was awarded the World Snooker Rookie of the Year award.

Hill lost his first 12 matches of the 2016–17 season, which included a 4–5 loss to Ronnie O'Sullivan having led the match 2-0 and 4–3 in the German Masters, before finally picking up a win in February at the Welsh Open as he beat Dechawat Poomjaeng 4–1. He lost 4–1 to Ali Carter in the next round. Hill was eliminated in the third round of the Shoot-Out by Li Hang and dropped off the tour at the end of the season, after he only won one match in the two Q School events.

On the Isle of Man, Hill was named the 2015 Under 21 Sportsman of the Year at the Isle of Man Sports Awards Ceremony and in 2017, he became the first snooker player to be inducted into the Manx Sporting Hall of Fame.

Personal life
Hill has worked at the Mann Cat Sanctuary since the age of nine to the present day. Hill is also a keen musician and has commercially released his own music.

During Hill's second year on the professional snooker tour he was plagued with health problems and was diagnosed with ulcerative colitis, a form of inflammatory bowel disease. At the end of the season he took some time out from the game to concentrate on his health. He has since returned to compete in World and European amateur events.

In the summer of 2020, he plans to open his own cuesports centre on the Isle of Man, named The Cue Zone IOM.

Performance and rankings timeline

Career finals

Amateur finals: 6 (4 titles)

References

External links 

Darryl Hill at worldsnooker.com
 Darryl Hill at CueTracker.net: Snooker Results and Statistic Database

Manx snooker players
Living people
1996 births
Snooker players from Leeds
Manx sportsmen